Brahmin Bulls is a 2014 American drama film directed by Mahesh Pailoor and starring Sendhil Ramamurthy, Roshan Seth, Mary Steenburgen, Justin Bartha and Michael Lerner.  It is Pailoor's feature directorial debut.

Cast
Sendhil Ramamurthy as Sid Sharma
Roshan Seth as Ashok Sharma
Mary Steenburgen as Helen West
Michael Lerner as David
Cassidy Freeman as Ellie
Justin Bartha as Alex
Monica Raymund as Maya

Release
The film was released in New York City on November 14, 2014.

Reception
The film has a 60 percent rating on Rotten Tomatoes based on 10 reviews.

Mike McCahill of The Guardian awarded the film two stars out of five and wrote, "Mahesh Pailoor’s film is appreciably relaxed around matters of age and race, yet – as a missing-cat subplot suggests – it’s somewhat underpowered."

Justin Lowe of The Hollywood Reporter gave the film a mixed review, calling it "an accomplished first feature that doesn’t quite achieve its initial promise."

Sheri Linden of the Los Angeles Times gave the film a negative review and wrote, "...the drama that unfolds from that gambit is too tepid to make the perpetrator’s redemption, let alone the fulfillment of his artistic vision, anything to root for."

Ben Kenigsberg of The New York Times gave the film a positive reviews and wrote, "Gaining in astringency as it goes along, Brahmin Bulls avoids the formulaic version of this story, in which the stubborn son learns from the more experienced father."

References

External links
 
 

2010s English-language films